Mehrjan (also Romanized as Mehrjān and Mehr Jān; also known as Marjān, Mehrījān, and Mihrjān) is a village in Nakhlestan Rural District, in the Central District of Khur and Biabanak County, Isfahan Province, Iran. At the 2006 census, its population was 687, in 202 families.

References 

Populated places in Khur and Biabanak County